Mulino, Oregon is a hamlet and census-designated place (CDP) located in Clackamas County, Oregon, United States, on Oregon Route 213 between the cities of Oregon City and Molalla. As of the 2010 census it had a population of 2,103.

Demographics

History
The community was named after a flour mill erected there in 1851, when the community was known as "Howards Mill." "Mulino" is a corruption of the Spanish word molino, or mill, and was chosen for the name when postal authorities objected that "Molino" was easily confused with nearby Molalla. The Mulino post office was established in 1882.

As of 2007, the mill building, remodeled into a private residence, still stands. According to a plaque given by the National Register of Historic Places, it is the oldest industrial building to remain standing in Oregon and the oldest building to serve continuously as the local post office. The mill, listed as Howard's Gristmill, was added to the National Register of Historic Places in 1981.

Local government
In May 2007, Mulino residents voted to become a hamlet, the third such community in Oregon, and the community was granted official hamlet status by the county on June 7, 2007.

Points of interest
Mulino is home to the Mulino State Airport, a general aviation facility owned and operated by the Oregon Department of Aviation.

Climate
This region experiences warm (but not hot) and dry summers, with no average monthly temperatures above 71.6 °F.  According to the Köppen Climate Classification system, Mulino has a warm-summer Mediterranean climate, abbreviated "Csb" on climate maps.

Notable people
 Tootie Smith, former state representative

References

Further reading

 Richard Engeman, "Mulino Flour Mill," The Oregon History Project, Oregon Historical Society, 2005.

External links
 Hamlet of Mulino (official website)
 Mulino official page at Clackamas County website
 Mulino Hamlet map
 Photos of Howard's Gristmill from millpictures.com

Hamlets in Oregon
Portland metropolitan area
Unincorporated communities in Clackamas County, Oregon
Census-designated places in Oregon
1882 establishments in Oregon
Populated places established in 1882
Unincorporated communities in Oregon